Bridge Street Properties is the name given to the redevelopment of a factory site on the Hudson River in Irvington, New York, United States.

History

Lord & Burnham 
Lord & Burnham company moved to Irvington in 1856 to be closer to the great estates that served as a market for the company's products, its celebrated glass conservatories. Beginning in 1894, the company purchased underwater property beyond the tracks and began filling in to create new land for an expansion. The expansion complex was completed by 1912, at which time the company employed 250 men.

The company used the property as additional factory space in the production process of their greenhouses. By 1988, only about a dozen employees remained at the Irvington factory, and Lord and Burnham ceased to exist when the factory closed in that year.

Bridge Street Properties, LLC. 
In 1995 Bridge Street Properties, LLC. purchased the building from Lord & Burnham Greenhouses with the intentions of converting the property into a more usable commercial space. The former factory was renovated and restored, allowing for various commercial businesses and restaurants to take residence in the building. Bridge Street Properties has made a number of enhancements to the property including the construction of a new three-story building along the water in 2003.

Rezoning effort

In February 2007, Bridge Street Properties petitioned the town of Irvington to change the zoning of the site from an Industrial Zone to a Mixed-use zone in order to facilitate the construction of 19 townhomes and new retail space in an effort to revitalize the area. After many negotiations with the town, the petition was withdrawn in February 2009 and the planned townhomes and retail space were never realized.

Notable events
Scenic Hudson Gala
In May 2008, the developers of the Bridge Street properties were honoured by Scenic Hudson, a group dedicated to encouraging environmentally friendly development, for the renovation of the property. The Bridge Street buildings comply with New York State’s Green building Initiative, ensuring that the development is eco-friendly. Additionally, Scenic Hudson recognized the developers for providing areas where the public can enjoy magnificent views of the Hudson River and Palisades.

Notable tenants
 CrossFit Valkyrie - an exercise and nutrition program
 Eileen Fisher - a women's clothing retailer
 Flat World Knowledge - an educational publisher
 House Party, Inc. - a marketing company
 Red Hat on the River - a restaurant
 PECO Pallet, Inc. - a pallet pooling services and logistics
 The Sundheim Group - a management consultancy

References
Notes

External links

Bridge Street Properties Rezoning Petition - 2007
Bridge Street Properties Withdrawal of Rezoning Petition - 2009

Redeveloped ports and waterfronts in the United States
Office suites
Real estate companies of the United States
Commercial buildings in New York (state)
Companies based in New York (state)
Irvington, New York